Triple Cross is a 1966 Anglo-French World War II spy film directed by Terence Young and produced by Jacques-Paul Bertrand. It was released in France in December 1966 as La Fantastique Histoire Vraie d'Eddie Chapman, but elsewhere in Europe and the United States in 1967 as Terence Young's Triple Cross. It was filmed in Eastman Color, print by Technicolor.

Triple Cross was based loosely on the real-life story of Eddie Chapman, believed by the Nazis to be their top spy in Great Britain, although he was actually an MI5 double agent known as "Zigzag". The title of the film comes from Chapman's signature to mark he was freely transmitting by radio, a Morse code XXX. Another meaning of the title "Triple Cross" becomes clear in the final scene of the film. Chapman, sitting at a bar, is asked who he was really working for. In reply, he raises his glass in salute to his reflection in the mirror.

Triple Cross is the second pairing of Terence Young and actress Claudine Auger. She was the leading James Bond girl in Thunderball (1965), which Young also directed.

Plot
In late 1930s London, debonair safecracker Eddie Chapman pulls off a series of heists but is caught and convicted while vacationing on the channel island of Jersey, where he is imprisoned. Months later, war commences and Jersey is occupied by German forces. Chapman offers them his services. Because of his unique qualifications, they accept. After faking his execution, the Germans smuggle Chapman into occupied France where, working closely with his handler, Col. Baron von Grunen, he is trained as a spy. He becomes romantically involved with a colleague known only as the Countess. But he is closely watched by ex-policeman Col. Steinhager, von Grunen's immediate subordinate.

On his first mission, Chapman is told he will be parachuted into England, but this turns out to be a test of his loyalty. Afterwards, he is dropped again, this time for real, on an actual mission in England. After landing, Chapman heads straight to the British authorities. After convincing them his story is true, they accept his offer to operate as a double agent for Britain in exchange for a full pardon. Meanwhile, his German superiors radio him an order to "Blow up Vickers" (referring to an aircraft factory). However, the British use dummy explosives and camouflage to convince the Germans Chapman has accomplished his mission.

In fact, upon his return to France, he is awarded the Iron Cross. Then in 1944, on his next mission to England, Chapman assists the British in feeding the Germans false information in order to divert their V-1 "buzz bombs" from falling on well-populated or strategic military targets. VE Day soon follows, and Chapman is awarded his pardon.

Cast

Production
In his autobiography, Christopher Plummer stated that Chapman was to have been a technical adviser on the film, but the French authorities would not allow him in the country because he was still wanted over an alleged plot to kidnap the Sultan of Morocco.

Reception
Reviews were generally mixed for Triple Cross. The review for Variety thought Plummer's performance was listless and the plot hackneyed. "Though based on a true story of a British safecracker who worked as a double spy during the Second World War, Triple Cross is made in the standard spy pattern of having him a ladies' man, fast with his mitts, glib and shrewd, and with overloaded and obvious suspense bits thrown in to rob this of the verisimilitude needed to give it a more original fillip."
Roger Ebert of the Chicago Sun-Times gave the film 2.5 out of 4 stars and described the film as: "A slow-paced, loosely plotted excursion into the Spy business. One or two competent performances struggle to its surface, tread water briefly and sink. It's hard to fix the blame."

References

Notes

Bibliography
 Plummer, Christopher. In Spite of Myself: A Memoir. New York: Afred A. Knopf, 2008. .

External links
 
 
 
 
 

1966 films
1960s spy films
1966 war films
British spy films
British war films
Films based on biographies
Films directed by Terence Young
Films set in the Channel Islands
Jersey in fiction
World War II films based on actual events
World War II spy films
English-language French films
Warner Bros. films
1960s British films